Mike McKool Snr. (born December 30, 1918, Mexico City) was a soldier, lawyer and Texas State Senator. He had served as a senator from 1969 to 1973. He died on February 22, 2003.

References

1918 births
George Washington University Law School alumni
Southern Methodist University alumni
Texas state senators
2003 deaths